KKLT may refer to:

 KKLT (FM), a K-Love radio station established in Arkansas in 2005
 KKLT mechanism, a construction in string theory